Bunarkaig (Scottish Gaelic: Bun Airceig) is a village on the north west shore of Loch Lochy in Lochaber, Inverness-shire, Highland and is in the Scottish council area of the Highlands.

References

Populated places in Lochaber